Opilio parietinus is a species of harvestman found in Europe and North America.  It is similar to O. canestrinii, but has dark spots on its coxae, and is generally more of a grayish green color. Like O. canestrini, it was often found on house walls in Central Europe, but has by now almost everywhere been replaced by this invasive species.

Images

References

Further reading
 Joel Hallan's Biology Catalog: Phalangiidae

Harvestmen
Arachnids of Europe
Animals described in 1778